Unequal Childhoods: Class, Race, and Family Life is a 2003 non-fiction book by American sociologist Annette Lareau based upon a study of 88 African American and white families (of which only 12 were discussed) to understand the impact of how social class makes a difference in family life, more specifically in children's lives. The book argues that regardless of race, social economic class will determine how children cultivate skills they will use in the future. In the second edition, Lareau revisits the subjects from the original study a decade later in order to examine the impact of social class on the transition to adulthood. She covers the subjects' awareness of their social class, high school experiences and the effect of organized activities as they went through their adolescent years. She emphasizes the use of concerted cultivation, and natural growth as tools parents in different social and economic classes use in order to raise their children and by continuing her research ten years later she is able to show how these methods of child rearing helped to cultivate the children into the adults they are today.

After her initial fieldwork was completed, Lareau returned to the families featured in her book to examine the pathways each of their lives had followed and to determine if her original research conclusions that class influences educational and work outcomes held true.  In most cases, they did. The majority of the poorer, working class participants had either dropped out of high school or not attended post-secondary institutions, or if they had, had not completed their courses.  Many were working in jobs that did not require a college degree and had already been working full-time for several years, some had children and car payments to support.  Some even gave money back to their parents as rent, for example, if they still lived at home.  This made them appear older than the middle class participants who generally had less work experience, and the majority of whom had attended college after going through an extensive preparatory process of investigating various institutions and receiving much greater support and involvement of their parents in making their decision, both about the college to attend and the courses to take.  The middle class youth were more likely to be in courses that would lead to professional type occupations like business, medicine and law.

Lareau found her earlier conclusions remained true: social class and parenting approaches significantly impacted educational and work outcomes.  Middle-class families had financial and knowledge resources that working-class families did not, and that was most visible as students worked their way through high school either successfully or not, and even more so when it came time to make decisions about attending college, what institution to attend and what courses to take.  Middle-class parents took a different approach to interventions in their children's lives than working-class parents and continued to play this support role and supervise as their children aged whereas working-class parents tended to stop once their children were 16–18 years old and it was felt they were old enough to make their own decisions.  Lareau comments in a lecture captured on YouTube that, "their lives had diverged in a profound way."  Unequal Childhoods encourages us to better understand the impact social class has on our educational and life choices as such decisions as who we will marry, where we will live and how we find jobs are influenced by social class and the advantages it may or may not bring.

Methodology

Lareau and her graduate researchers followed these families around in their daily lives. They attended sporting events, spent the night in the family's home, and attended a doctor's visit to observe the differences between the working- and lower-class families, and middle-class families. During her observations, she notices two different parenting styles.

In her follow-up with families ten years later, Lareau admits that the ideal study would have involved on-going participant observation, but that was not feasible given the resources and time investment of the families that would have required.  Instead, she conducted two hour recorded interviews with each of the twelve children, and had separate interviews with each of the mothers, fathers and siblings that agreed to be interviewed.  Some declined.
In response to the second edition of the book, critics continue to comment on the limitations of this study given its small sample size, while applying broad theoretical conclusions to North American society.  Lareau briefly addresses race factors having an influence on outcomes for youth, but claims the class factors play a more significant role.

Parenting styles

Annette Lareau distinguishes between two different parenting styles: Concerted Cultivation and the Accomplishment of Natural Growth.

Concerted Cultivation: The parenting style, favored by middle-class families, in which parents encourage negotiation and discussion and the questioning of authority, and enroll their children in extensive organized activity participation. This style helps children in middle-class careers, teaches them to question people in authority, develops a large vocabulary, and makes them comfortable in discussions with people of authority. However, it gives the children a sense of entitlement.

Accomplishment of Natural Growth: The parenting style, favored by working-class and lower-class families, in which parents issue directives to their children rather than negotiations, encourage the following and trusting of people in authority positions, and do not structure their children's daily activities, but rather let the children play on their own. This method has benefits that prepare the children for a job in the "working" or "poor-class" jobs, teaches the children to respect and take the advice of people in authority, and allows the children to become independent at a younger age.

Reviews
 Margaret Foley, "Class Matters", "Mother's Movement Online", October, 2005.
 Harry Brighouse, "David Brooks on Annette Lareau’s Unequal Childhoods", "Crooked Timber", March 12, 2006; BW05
 Elizabeth Lower-Basch, "Review: Unequal Childhoods", "Half Changed World", May 4, 2005
 Gladwell, M. (2008). Outliers: The story of success. New York: Little, Brown and Co.
 Linda Quirke, "Book Review of Unequal Childhoods:Class, Race, and Family Life, Second Edition with an Update a Decade Later. (https://ejournals.library.ualberta.ca/index.php/CJS/article/viewFile/16651/13567), Berkeley: University of California Press, pp480, 2011

See also
Concerted cultivation
Middle class
Working class
Social class

External links
 "Unequal Childhoods", University of California Press,
 "Annette Lareau, Ph.D" University of Pennsylvania, Department of Sociology , from University of Pennsylvania
 "Annette Lareau, Professor" "Department of Sociology", From University of Maryland, College Park
 Unequal Childhoods, by Annette Lareau from "Beingnotdoing.org"
 Unequal Childhoods and Unequal Adulthoods with Annette Lareau – Knowledge by the Slice, UPenn
(https://www.youtube.com/watch?v=2xq_iCMgP2Q)
 A sociology presentation highlighting two individuals from Annette Lareau's "Unequal Childhoods", (https://www.youtube.com/watch?v=iKZxmGFo118)
 Summary of Annette Lareau's Unequal Childhoods, from Study.com

Further reading
 David R. Roediger: Colored White: Transcending the Racial Past. University of California Press. 
 "Sharon Hays": Flat Broke with Children: Women in the Age of Welfare Reform. Oxford University Press. 
 "Linda Stout": Bridging the Class Divide: And Other Lessons for Grassroots Organizing. Beacon Press. 
 Michael Katz: The Price of Citizenship: Redefining the American Welfare State.. (Metropolitan Books.) New York: Henry Holt, 2001. 
 Viviana Zelizer: Pricing the Priceless Child: The Changing Social Value of Children, Princeton University Press, 1985. 
 "William Corsaro": The Sociology of Childhood, fifth edition Sage (2018). 
 Nancy Darling: Parenting styles and its correlates. University of Illinois. 1999.
 Christopher Spera: A Review of the Relationship Among Parenting Practices, Parenting Styles and Adolescent Achievement. Educational Psychology Review, Vol.17 No.2, June 2005.
Waters, Tony:   "Schooling, Childhood, and Bureaucracy: Bureaucratizing the Child."Palgrave MacMillan 2012. Print

References

2003 non-fiction books
Race in the United States
Social class in the United States
Sociology books
Ethnographic studies of education